The 2021–22 Central Arkansas Bears basketball team represented the University of Central Arkansas (UCA) in the 2021–22 NCAA Division I men's basketball season. The Bears, led by second-year head coach Anthony Boone, played their home games at the on-campus Farris Center in Conway, Arkansas. This was the Bears' first season as members of the West Division of the ASUN Conference.

Previous season
The Bears finished the 2020–21 season 5–19, 4–12 in Southland play to finish in twelfth place. They failed to qualify for the Southland Conference tournament. UCA left the Southland in July 2021 to join the ASUN Conference.

Roster

Schedule and results

|-
!colspan=12 style=| Non-conference Regular season

|-
!colspan=13 style=| ASUN Conference regular season

|-
!colspan=12 style=| ASUN tournament

Source

References

Central Arkansas Bears basketball seasons
Central Arkansas
Central Arkansas Bears basketball
Central Arkansas Bears basketball